= Ekadeshma International Short Film Festival =

Film festival in Nepal

Ekadeshma International Short Film Festival or simply Ekadeshma is an annual film festival in Nepal for short film. Ekadeshma began from October, 2012, since the start there have been 5 festivals.
